Snakeman (stylized as SnakeMan), also known as The Snake King, is a Syfy original film that premiered April 8, 2005 on the Syfy channel.

Story 
Anthropologists deep in the Amazon uncover the remains of a man they come to determine was approximately 300 years old when he died. This leads to a second expedition to discover the reason behind his longevity, but there's a major problem in the form of an Amazonian tribe that guards the proverbial fountain of youth and the giant, multi-headed snake they worship.

The scientists, led by Dr. Susan Elters (Jayne Heitmeyer), local amazonians, and their guide, Matt Ford (Stephen Baldwin), work their way through the jungle losing half the crew on the way and discover the tribe known as the Snake People. Once they find the tribe, they are held hostage and the only way they can leave peacefully is if they bring their recently discovered remains.

The scientists are able to contact the head of the expedition who promises to bring the body back. When he and his soldiers show up without the body, they become enemies with the Snake People. They search for the fountain of youth, killing Snake People along the way. They find the fountain in a cave and the final battle between the scientists and the snake takes place. The entire team of soldiers are killed and the only people left alive are Dr. Susan Elters and Matt Ford, who find that they need to keep the secrets to eternal youth with the Snake People.

Cast
 Stephen Baldwin as Matt Ford
 Jayne Heitmeyer as Dr. Susan Elters
 Larry Day as Dr. Rick Gordon
 Gary Hudson as Dr. John Simon
 Ross McCall as Timothy
 Jorge Tarquini as Jonathan Rodgers
 Phil Miler as Dr. Richman (as Marcelo Gomes de Oliveira)
 Gideon Rosa as Dahar
 Caco Monteiro as Will Bahia (as Caludio de Carvalho Monteiro)
 Shelly Varod as Sil Santini
 Mike Zafra as "Rush" Fernandez
 Narcival Rubens as Tika
 Lucas Wilber Silva Laborda as Bada
 Charles Paraventi as Ronald
 Michael P. Flannigan as Jim (as Michael Flannigan)
 Sandro Lyrio as Edwardo
 Agnaldo Santos Lopez as Mase
 Caio Roderigo Chaves as Prospector
 Randolph Burlton as Snakeman

Release

Home media
Snakeman was released on DVD by First Look Pictures on March 21, 2006. It was later released by Boulevard Entertainment on December 15, 2008.

Reception

Dread Central panned the film, awarding it a score of 0 1/2 out of 5, writing "Snake King is one of those movies so formulaic it very easily could have been written by an automated screenwriting program. You got the good guy male lead that knows his way around these parts, you got the female lead that ends up becoming his love interest, you got the bad guys that all eventually end up getting killed one way or another, and everyone else is just snake fodder. It’s all done in such a lifeless manner that it manages to fail as either a monster movie or a jungle adventure." Popcorn Pictures similarly panned the film, rating it a score of 1/10, and calling it "a low grade straight-to-TV movie".

See also
 List of killer snake films

References

External links 
 
 
 

Films about snakes
2005 horror films
American natural horror films
Nu Image films
American monster movies
2005 television films
Films directed by Allan A. Goldstein
Films set in jungles
Films set in the Amazon
2005 films
Syfy original films
Films with screenplays by Allan A. Goldstein
2000s English-language films
Films produced by Boaz Davidson
Films with screenplays by Boaz Davidson
2000s American films